The Satanic Witch is a book by Anton LaVey, currently published by Feral House. The book is a treatise on lesser magic, a system of manipulation by means of applied psychology and glamour (or "wile and guile") to bend an individual or situation to one's will. The book is introduced as an extension of LaVey's witches workshops which were conducted prior to the founding of the Church. The book presents its methods as a tool of the feminine, and how the female can enchant and manipulate men. 

The book was first published as The Compleat Witch, or What to Do When Virtue Fails, in 1971 by Dodd, Mead & Company. The first paperback edition was released by Lancer Books in 1972. It was republished by Feral House in 1989 with an introduction by Zeena LaVey, wherein it was retitled The Satanic Witch; and again in 2003 with a new introduction by Peggy Nadramia and afterword by Blanche Barton. The book concludes with a bibliography of over 170 books on topics of psychology, anthropology, sociology, biology and volumes on sexuality and body language. The publisher describes the book as "...undiluted Gypsy lore regarding the forbidden knowledge of seduction and manipulation."

Editions
 LaVey, Anton Szandor. The Satanic Witch. (2003 2nd ed. 1st printing), Feral House.

References

External links
 The Compleat Story of The Compleat Witch
 "Anton LaVey and Women - Apologetics" by Vexen Crabtree from "A Defence Of Common Attacks on Satanism"

1971 non-fiction books
English-language books
Modern witchcraft
Works by Anton LaVey
Criticism of feminism
Feral House books
Dodd, Mead & Co. books
Church of Satan